The Japanese kusudama (薬玉; lit. medicine ball) is a paper model that is usually (although not always) created by sewing multiple identical pyramidal units together using underlying geometric principles of polyhedra to form a spherical shape. Alternately the individual components may be glued together. (e.g. the kusudama in the lower photo is not threaded together) Occasionally, a tassel is attached to the bottom for decoration.

The term kusudama originates from ancient Japanese culture, where they were used for incense and potpourri; possibly originally being actual bunches of flowers or herbs. The word itself is a combination of two Japanese words kusuri ("medicine") and tama ("ball"). They are now typically used as decorations, or as gifts.

The kusudama is important in origami particularly as a precursor to modular origami. It is often confused with modular origami, but is not such because the units are strung or pasted together, instead of folded together as most modular construction are made.

It is, however, still origami, although origami purists frown upon threading or gluing the units together, while others recognize that early traditional Japanese origami often used both cutting (see thousand origami cranes or senbazuru) and pasting, and respect kusudama as an ingenious traditional paper folding craft in the origami world.

Modern origami masters such as Tomoko Fuse have created new kusudama designs that are entirely assembled without cutting, glue, or thread except as a hanger.

Waritama

Kusudama can also be used to refer to a type of decoration that is displayed and split open for celebrations. This decoration is more specifically called waritama (割り玉; lit. split ball). Waritama are large, spherical decorations that split in half to release confetti, streamers, balloons, etc. They can be used for a variety of events, including school events, graduation ceremonies, enterprise founding anniversaries, and sports competitions.

An emoji depicting a waritama, called Confetti Ball (🎊), was introduced with the October 2010 release of Unicode 6.0. It is the Emoticons Unicode block: .

See also
 Modular origami

Notes and references

Further reading
 Unit Origami: Multidimensional Transformation Tomoko Fuse, Japan Publications, 1990, 
 Floral Origami Globes (New Kusudama) Tomoko Fuse, Japan Publications Trading, 2007, 
 Kusudama Origami Tomoko Fuse, Japan Publications, 2002, 
 Kusudama: Ball Origami Makoto Yamaguchi, Japan Publications, 1990, 
 Origami Ornaments: The Ultimate Kusudama Book Lew Rozelle, St. Martin's Griffin, 2000 
 Origami Flower Ball (Origami Hana Kusudama) (in Japanese) Yoshihide Momotani, Ishizue Publishers, 1994, 
 Marvelous Modular Origami Meenakshi Mukerji, A K Peters. 2007,

External links
 OrigamiTube.com Learn how to fold kusudama in motion.
 The few good Kusudams with diagrams.
 Video tutorial: How to Fold a Japanese Paper Ball (Kusudama)
 kusudama by Atelier Puupuu: diagrams of making kusudama
 kusudama by Lukasheva Ekaterina many models, diagrams and tutorial 
 Kusudama by Mikhail Puzakov & Ludmila Puzakova: new models, folding instruction, history, geometry 

Origami
Shinto in Japan
Shinto religious objects
Exorcism in Shinto